Roveredo is a village and former municipality in the canton of Ticino, Switzerland.

In 2001 the municipality was merged with the other, neighboring municipalities Cagiallo, Lopagno, Sala Capriasca, Tesserete and Vaglio to form a new and larger municipality Capriasca.

Location

The village of Roveredo is located in the upper Capriasca valley on the right side of the entrance to the Val Colla.

Historic population
The historical population is given in the following chart:

References

Former municipalities of Ticino
Villages in Switzerland